The Cooper School is a co-educational secondary school and sixth form with academy status, located in the northern side of Bicester, Oxfordshire.

History
Previously a community school administered by Oxfordshire County Council, the school became a specialist science college in 2005. The Cooper School converted to academy status on 1 July 2014 within Bernwode Schools Trust, however, the school continues to coordinate with Oxfordshire County Council for admissions.

The Cooper School is currently rated 'Requires improvement' by Ofsted after an inspection in January 2023

Catchment area
Most of its students come from the north and east of Bicester and surrounding villages which include, amongst others, Charlton-on-Otmoor, Launton, Finmere, Fringford, Stratton Audley and Hethe.

Uniform
Since September 2008, The Cooper School has had a radical change of uniform. This now includes a black blazer, white shirt and school tie (black, gold and blue), which is essentially the same style of uniform that the school had when it first opened in the 1970s. In addition, as of September 2013, The Cooper School has made black jumpers or blouses a compulsory part of the uniform.

The Sixth Form
In 2011 a new sixth-form building, called the Post 16 Centre, was constructed and opened to students in September of the same year. The current head of sixth form at The Cooper School is Jennifer Post, and there are currently over 200 students in Years 12 and 13.

Past headteachers
Keith McClellan [January 1988 – August 2000]
Andrew Hamilton [September 2000 - August 2005]
Ben Baxter [September 2005 - August 2020]

References

External links
 School Website
 Ofsted

Secondary schools in Oxfordshire
Bicester
Academies in Oxfordshire